Victoria Azarenka was the defending champion, but withdrew before her quarterfinal match against Caroline Wozniacki.

Maria Sharapova won her second Indian Wells title, defeating Wozniacki in the final, 6–2, 6–2.

Seeds
All seeds receive a bye into the second round.

Draw

Finals

Top half

Section 1

Section 2

Section 3

Section 4

Bottom half

Section 5

Section 6

Section 7

Section 8

Qualifying

Seeds
{{columns-list|colwidth=30em|
  Stefanie Vögele (qualifying competition, lucky loser)
  Lesia Tsurenko (qualified)
  Misaki Doi (first round)  Elina Svitolina (qualified)
  María Teresa Torró Flor (qualifying competition)  Yulia Putintseva (first round)  CoCo Vandeweghe (first round)  Vesna Dolonc (first round)  Garbiñe Muguruza (qualified)
  Eleni Daniilidou (qualifying competition)
  Jana Čepelová (first round)
  Kristýna Plíšková (first round)
  Melinda Czink (qualifying competition)
  Monica Puig (qualified)  Maria João Koehler (qualifying competition)
  Anastasia Rodionova (qualifying competition)
  Mirjana Lučić-Baroni (qualified)
  Estrella Cabeza Candela (qualifying competition)  Olga Puchkova (qualified)
  Nina Bratchikova (qualifying competition)''
  Stéphanie Foretz Gacon (qualified)
  Marta Sirotkina (first round)
  Alexa Glatch (first round)
  Sesil Karatantcheva (qualified)}}

Qualifiers

Lucky losers
  Stefanie Vögele'''

Draw

First qualifier

Second qualifier

Third qualifier

Fourth qualifier

Fifth qualifier

Sixth qualifier

Seventh qualifier

Eighth qualifier

Ninth qualifier

Tenth qualifier

Eleventh qualifier

Twelfth qualifier

External links
Main Draw
Qualifying Draw

BNP Paribas Open- Women's Singles
2013 BNP Paribas Open